John Holt plc is a Nigerian conglomerate that participates in many areas of the economy. The Nigerian company is a subsidiary of John Holt & Co. (Liverpool) Ltd, a British company.  A minority of the shares are traded on the Nigerian Stock Exchange.

History

Origins 

The company traces its origins to 1862 when John Holt, 20 years old at the time, with £27 in his pocket, sailed from Liverpool to take up an appointment as a shop assistant in a grocery store in Fernando Po (now part of Equatorial Guinea). Five years later, he bought out his employer, and he was joined by his brother Jonathan.  In 1868, Jonathan bought a schooner, which enabled the brothers to open more trading posts in West Africa.  In 1874 the brothers opened an office in Liverpool.  In 1881, John entered the palm oil trade.

In 1884, the brothers formed a partnership, John Holt and Company, to consolidate their business interests.  Subsequently, John entered into new partnerships, including a venture in Lagos in Nigeria in 1887.

The Liverpool company

In 1897, the partnerships were absorbed into a new limited company, John Holt & Co. (Liverpool) Ltd.  The company built up an extensive produce trade, in which palm oil, palm kernels, rubber and cocoa were exported from Nigeria to England.  Imports included textiles from Lancashire and bicycles from Birmingham.   A fleet of ships operated a fortnightly service from Liverpool to West Africa and the Company also had its own fleet of river craft.

Apart from produce and merchandise, these river craft also carried cash. Where banks did not exist, John Holt had strong rooms. Even after banks were established, many Nigerians preferred to deposit their cash with John Holt.

In 1970, the company was taken over by Lonrho.  In 2001, Lonrho sold the company to a management-led group of investors.

The Nigerian company

In 1961, the Liverpool company formed a locally incorporated subsidiary in Nigeria, John Holt Limited, to hold its Nigerian interests. It became a public company and was quoted on the Nigerian Stock Exchange in May 1974.

The company today 
The company's businesses in Nigeria include the assembly and distribution of power generators, leasing, distribution of fire-fighting equipment, logistics, boat building and fabrication of industrial and agricultural equipment.

The parent company in Liverpool is involved in the procurement and finance of exports.

References

Further reading 
 Decker, S. Return to Imperial Trade? John Holt & Co (Liverpool) Ltd. as a Contemporary Free-standing Company, 1945-2006 in The Empire in one city?: Liverpool's inconvenient imperial past Manchester University Press (2008)

External links

John Holt corporate website
Google Finance listing for John Holt

Companies based in Lagos
Companies listed on the Nigerian Stock Exchange
History of Nigeria
Companies based in Liverpool
Nigerian subsidiaries of foreign companies